The British Methodist Episcopal Church (BMEC) is a Protestant church in Canada that has its roots in the African Methodist Episcopal Church (AMEC) of the United States.

History
The AMEC had been formed in 1816 when a number of black congregations banded together under the leadership of Richard Allen, and by the mid-1850s it had seven conferences in the United States. AMEC preachers began to work in Upper Canada in 1834, and a conference was formed in 1840.

In 1850, the Fugitive Slave Act was passed in the United States causing some ex-slave AMEC preachers in the United Canadas to be fearful of attending conferences in the U.S.

Reverend Benjamin Stewart of Chatham, Ontario proposed that the AME churches in the United Canadas separate from the U.S. association and form their own church.  At an AME conference the new church was named the British Methodist Episcopal Church in appreciation of finding a safe haven from slavery in British North America. In Philadelphia in 1856, Stewart's proposal was adopted and the new church association was founded. Reverend Augustus R. Green, later BME Bishop Green (though he is reported as being thrown out of the Church when he and colleagues later challenged Nazrey, whereupon they began the Independent Methodist Episcopal Church), publisher and editor of the True Royalist and Weekly Intelligencer was also a part of this movement.

Its first bishop was Reverend Willis Nazrey of Virginia. When Nazrey died in 1875, Richard Randolph Disney was chosen as his successor, and he was ordained by an AMEC bishop that year. His administrative area consisted of Ontario, Nova Scotia, Bermuda, the West Indies, and British Guiana (Guyana).

By 1880, the BMEC had "grown from 250 to 2,684 members, and boasted 77 ministers, 37 Sabbath-schools, 1,727 scholars, 156 officers and teachers, 10 church buildings, and over 25,000 attendees in the Caribbean". However, the mission work outside Canada stretched the church's funds, and in 1880 Disney negotiated a reunion with the AMEC at the quadrennial General Conference, setting into motion a union between the AMEC and the BMEC that was later ratified at a BMEC convention held at Hamilton in June 1881.  The merger seemed beneficial for the AMEC because of the step that it represented towards the consolidation of Black Methodists across the United States. A merger would also stretch the AMEC's influence. A referendum of members showed that although a majority in Ontario was opposed, 86 per cent of the membership was in favour. Disney was accepted as an AMEC bishop and was assigned to its Tenth Episcopal District, a region embracing his former territory and some of the AMEC churches in Canada that had not joined the BMEC.

A majority of the Ontario churches and preachers, led by the Reverend Walter Hawkins of Chatham, sought to re-establish the BMEC. This group feared the loss of their distinctive identity, and may have been concerned that the opinions of Ontario members had been overwhelmed by those of the Caribbean groups. 

In 1886 this group held an ecclesiastical council at Chatham, at which it was claimed that Disney had defected to the AMEC. At a subsequent general conference that year the BMEC was reconstituted. The conference deposed Disney, agreeing to "erase his name and ignore his authority, and cancel his official relationship as bishop." The reconstituted BMEC elected Hawkins as its general superintendent, avoiding the title of bishop for several years.

Disney continued with what was left of his AMEC district until 1888, when he was transferred to Arkansas and Mississippi.

By 1898 the BMEC had 27 preaching points and 25 preachers, the AMEC 130 churches in Canada. The two denominations continue their separate work to this day.

Modern day

The BME church has seen a major decline in membership over the years, resulting in many closures. In 1985, the BME church in Woodstock, Ontario, Hawkins Chapel, shut its doors and was converted into a single-family home. The BME church of Collingwood followed a similar fate in 1990. In 2003, the North Buxton congregation broke with the church - choosing to operate as an independent community church instead. The most recent church to close its doors was in Guelph in 2011. The former BME building was put up for sale, and purchased by the Guelph Black Heritage Society in 2012.

Although now closed, other BME churches existed in Stratford, Fort Erie, Queen's Bush, Puce (Lakeshore), Simcoe, Ingersoll, Dresden, and Harrow. These churches would have formed the centre of a sizable black community in these towns.

Two BME churches have been designated National Historic Sites of Canada due to their roles in welcoming Underground Railroad refugees to the United Canadas and their historic importance to the Black community in the Niagara region: one in Niagara Falls, Ontario, named in honour of Robert Nathaniel Dett, and the Salem Chapel, British Methodist Episcopal Church in St. Catharines, due to its association with Harriet Tubman.

As of 2018, fewer than 9 churches remain in operation, with churches operating in the following cities:

Ontario

 Toronto (2) - East York and York
 London
 Owen Sound
 Brantford
 Windsor
 Mississauga
 Niagara Falls
 St. Catharines
Brantford

Bishops
 Reverend Willis Nazrey (1856-1875)
 Bishop Richard Randolph Disney (1875-

See also
List of Methodist churches
List of Methodist denominations
Richard Amos Ball

References

Sources
Windsor Mosaic
Dictionary of Canadian Biography
Ontario Heritage Trust Salem Chapel British Methodist Episcopal Church

Methodism in Canada
Methodist denominations in North America
African Methodist Episcopal Church
1834 establishments in Canada
History of Black people in Canada
Black Canadian organizations